ECAA may refer to:

 European Common Aviation Area
 Egyptian Civil Aviation Authority
 Ethiopian Civil Aviation Authority